Antonio Scurati (born 25 June 1969) is an Italian writer and academic. In 2019, he was awarded the prestigious Strega Prize for his novel M: Son of the Century (2018).

Early life and education 
Scurati was born in Naples to a Neapolitan mother and a father from Cusano Milanino. He graduated with a degree in philosophy from the University of Milan. He continued his studies at the School for Advanced Studies in the Social Sciences in Paris. Scurati later completed a PhD in Theory and Text Analysis at the University of Bergamo. He worked as a professore a contratto at Bergamo, where he coordinated a center for studying the languages of war and violence. At Bergamo, he also taught the theory and elements of television language. In 2005, he became a researcher in Cinema, Photography, Television. In 2008, he moved to the IULM University of Milan, where he is currently an associate professor and conducts a creative writing seminar and a seminar in orality and rhetoric.

Career 
In 2003, he published the essay Guerra. Narrazioni e culture nella tradizione occidentale, which was a finalist for the Viareggio Prize. His novel Il sopravvissuto (2005) was awarded (in a tie with Pino Roveredo) the 43rd Premio Campiello. In 2006, a revised edition of Scurati's debut novel, Il rumore sordo della battaglia, was published. In 2006, Scurati published the essay "La letteratura dell'inesperienza. Scrivere romanzi al tempo della televisione": a reflection on media, Dadaism, literature and humanism.

Scurati's writing has appeared in the weekly publication  and the daily newspaper La Stampa. In 2007, he published the historical novel Una storia romantica. In the same year, Scurati produced a documentary for the Italian company Fandango. The documentary, La stagione dell'amore, is a film that investigates themes of love in contemporary Italian society, continuing the investigation conducted by director Pier Paolo Pasolini in his film Love Meetings (1965). In 2009, he published Il bambino che sognava la fine del mondo, a novel that mixes reality and fiction and is a fierce criticism of mass media and the information economy as a whole.

In 2010, he published Gli anni che non stiamo vivendo. Il tempo della cronaca, a collection of articles on contemporary topics of crime, politics and current affairs. In the same year, he addressed the same topics in the column "Lettere dal nord" within the television program . In 2015, he published Il tempo migliore della nostra vita, a biographical novel dedicated to the life of Leone Ginzburg. It was awarded the Viareggio Prize and was a finalist for the Premio Campiello.

On 20 September 2019, the Corriere della Sera announced that Scurati would begin writing a column for the newspaper. His first article, concerning euthanasia, appeared in the newspaper on 28 September 2019.

M tetralogy
In September 2018, Scurati published the novel M: Son of the Century, the first volume in a series of four books about Benito Mussolini. The tetralogy intends to tell the history of Italy beginning on 23 March 1919, the day the Italian Fasces of Combat was founded, and ending in 1945. The novel concludes with Mussolini's speech to the Chamber of Deputies on 3 January 1925, which officially established Italy as a dictatorship following the political crisis caused by the murder of Giacomo Matteotti. Scurati responded to the controversy in a column also published in the Corriere della Sera. In it, he argued that the current era requires "a cooperation between the rigor of historical accurary and the art of the novel". On the night between 4 and 5 July 2019, M. Il figlio del secolo was awarded the prestigious Strega Prize. The novel was a success, selling over 600,000 copies. It is currently being translated for publication in 46 countries and is in production for a television series adaptation. The English translation by Anne Milano Appel was published by Harper on 5 April 2022.

In September 2020, M. L'uomo della provvidenza, the second volume of the quartet was published. It follows the parable of Mussolini from 1925 to 1932, recounting his liberticidal politics and the fierce power struggles and ideological battles of the National Fascist Party. It is framed by the omnipresent figure of Mussolini and his mediocrities and eccentricities. The novel was translated into French in 2021, and was awarded the 2022 European Book Prize.

In September 2022, the third volume of the series was released, M. Gli ultimi giorni dell'Europa, which follows the fateful years from 1938 to 1940 that would lead to Italy's entry into World War II.

The series was initially planned as a trilogy. It is currently projected as a tetralogy. In October 2022, Scurati commented: "At this point it is clear that I will need a fourth and perhaps a fifth to complete the parable".

Works

Novels

Essays

Documentary

References

External links 
 

1969 births
Living people
21st-century Italian male writers
21st-century Italian novelists
21st-century Italian non-fiction writers
21st-century Italian journalists
Anti-fascism
Italian male novelists
Italian male non-fiction writers
Italian male journalists
Writers from Naples
Premio Campiello winners
Strega Prize winners
University of Milan alumni
School for Advanced Studies in the Social Sciences alumni
University of Bergamo alumni
Academic staff of the University of Bergamo
Academic staff of the IULM University of Milan